Tadeusz Walasek (15 July 1936 – 4 November 2011) was a Polish boxer. He competed at the 1956, 1960 and 1964 Olympics and won a silver medal in 1960 and a bronze in 1964, both in the middleweight division. In 1960 he lost the final bout to Eddie Crook by a narrow margin (2:3).

Walasek competed three times at the European Amateur Boxing Championships and won two silver medals, in 1957 in the light middleweight division and in 1959 in the middleweight category, and a gold medal in 1961 in the middleweight.

He was the winner of the Aleksander Reksza Boxing Award 1996.

References

1936 births
2011 deaths
People from Łomża County
Olympic boxers of Poland
Boxers at the 1956 Summer Olympics
Boxers at the 1960 Summer Olympics
Boxers at the 1964 Summer Olympics
Olympic silver medalists for Poland
Olympic bronze medalists for Poland
Olympic medalists in boxing
Medalists at the 1960 Summer Olympics
Medalists at the 1964 Summer Olympics
Sportspeople from Podlaskie Voivodeship
Polish male boxers
Middleweight boxers
21st-century Polish people
20th-century Polish people